Stormy In The North, Karma In The South is the title of a single released by The Wildhearts.

Track listing
Disc 1:
Stormy In The North, Karma In The South
Bang!
If I Decide

Disc 2:
Stormy In The North, Karma In The South
You Got To Get Through What You've Got To Go Through To Get What You Want, But You Got to Know What You Want To Get Through What You Got To Go Through
Move On

There was also a DVD released detailing how the video was made, but the video itself was not featured on the DVD.

References

The Wildhearts songs
2003 songs